Bunbury is a coastal city in the Australian state of Western Australia, approximately  south of the state capital, Perth. It is the state's third most populous city after Perth and Mandurah, with a population of approximately 75,000.

Located at the south of the Leschenault Estuary, Bunbury was established in 1836 on the orders of Governor James Stirling, and named in honour of its founder, Lieutenant (at the time) Henry Bunbury. A port was constructed on the existing natural harbour soon after, and eventually became the main port for the wider South West region. Further economic growth was fuelled by completion of the South Western Railway in 1893, which linked Bunbury with Perth.

Greater Bunbury includes four local government areas (the City of Bunbury and the shires of Capel, Dardanup, and Harvey), and extends between Yarloop in the north, Boyanup to the south and Capel to the southwest.

History

Pre-European history
The original inhabitants of Greater Bunbury are the Indigenous Australian Noongar people. The people hunted and fished throughout the sub-region prior to the first European settlement in the 1830s. The area was originally known as "Goomburrup" before the arrival of Lt. Bunbury.

Early colonial period

The first registered sighting of Greater Bunbury was by French explorer Captain Louis de Freycinet from his ship the Casuarina in 1803. He named the area Port Leschenault after the expedition's botanist, Leschenault de La Tour. The bay on Greater Bunbury's western shores was named Geographe after another ship in the fleet.

In 1829, Dr Alexander Collie and Lieutenant Preston explored the area of Bunbury on land. In 1830 Lieutenant Governor Sir James Stirling visited the area and a military post was subsequently established; it only lasted six months. The area was renamed Bunbury by the Governor in recognition of Lieutenant Henry William St Pierre Bunbury, who developed the very difficult inland route from Pinjarra to Bunbury. Bunbury's first settlers were John and Helen Scott, their sons Robert, William and John Jr, and step-son Daniel McGregor, who arrived in January 1838. Bunbury township was mentioned in the Government Gazette in 1839, but lots in the township were not surveyed until 1841. In March 1841 lots were declared open for selection.

Intermittent bay whaling activity was conducted on the coast from the 1830s through to the 1850s.

By 1842 Bunbury was home to 16 buildings including an inn. Thereafter, a growing port serviced the settlers and the subsequent local industries that developed.

One of the major industries to open up to cement the importance of Bunbury as a port was the timber industry. Timber logs would be floated down the Collie River to be loaded aboard ships headed to the Northern Hemisphere or to South Africa where the hardwood timbers were used for railway sleepers.

When the line was completed in 1887, the contractor who had built it obtained a contract to control and work it, which he did with horses. The line was eventually taken over by the Government in 1891 and operated with locomotives. The inconvenience of a railway isolated from the capital gave rise to agitation and in 1893 the South Western Railway was constructed between East Perth and Picton, connecting Greater Bunbury and Perth. The Boyanup line was extended to Donnybrook in the same year. The railways connected the port of Bunbury to the coal and mineral deposits and agricultural areas to the north and east of Greater Bunbury.

The population of the town was 2,970 (1,700 males and 1,270 females) in 1898.

In 1903 a breakwater to further protect the bay and port area was completed.

Federation to present day
The Old Bunbury railway station served as the terminal for the Australind passenger train between Perth, transporting its first passengers on 24 November 1947. The last train to use the station departed on 28 May 1985 with a new station opening at East Bunbury,  to the south-east the following day. The railway land was then sold and Blair Street realigned.

Geography

Climate
Bunbury has a Mediterranean climate (Köppen classification Csa) with warm to hot, dry summers and cool wet winters. Precipitation peaks from the months of May to September.

Demographics
In 2007 Bunbury was recognised as Australia's fastest growing city for the 2005/06 period by the Australian Bureau of Statistics.

At June 2018 the estimated urban population of Bunbury was 74,363. At the 2016 Census the median age was 38. It is estimated that by 2031 the population of the Greater Bunbury region will exceed 100,000 people.

In urban Bunbury at the 2021 census, 74.8% of people were born in Australia. The most common other countries of birth were England 5.5%, New Zealand 3.0%, South Africa 1.9%, the Philippines 1.3% and India 0.8%. 85.0% of people only spoke English at home. Other languages spoken at home included Afrikaans 1.0%, Italian 0.8%, Tagalog 0.5%, Mandarin 0.2%, and Filipino 0.4%.

In the 2016 Census the most common responses for religion in Bunbury were No religion 34.6%, Catholic 20.5%, Anglican 17.8%, Christian, nfd (not further described) 3.4%.

The most common occupations in Bunbury included Technicians and Trades Workers 19.0%, Professionals 15.8%, Labourers 12.7%, and Clerical and Administrative Workers 11.8%. In 2016 Bunbury had an unemployment rate of 8.2%.

Governance

The Greater Bunbury sub-region comprises the four local government areas of the City of Bunbury, Shire of Capel, Shire of Dardanup and Shire of Harvey. The Greater Bunbury Region Scheme, in operation since November 2007, provides the legal basis for planning in the Greater Bunbury sub-region.

The Greater Bunbury sub-region is administered by State and local governments. There is no sub-region government structure in place for Greater Bunbury.

In December 2013 the Western Australian Planning Commission published the Greater Bunbury Strategy to guide urban, industrial and regional land use planning; and associated infrastructure delivery in the Greater Bunbury sub-region in the short, medium and long terms. The Strategy provides for the growth of Greater Bunbury through infill development of existing urban areas and the development of greenfield land in Waterloo east of Eaton, to provide for a population of 150,000 people beyond 2050.

Economy

The economy of Bunbury is diverse, reflecting the range of heavy and general industries in the locality, mining, agricultural landscapes, services for the growing population, key transport links and the influence of Perth.

The mining and mineral processing sector remains the main economic driver for Bunbury ($2 billion annual turnover). The agriculture sector however, remains vitally important as the value of production is approximately $146 million per annum (2005/06) which equates to approximately 30 per cent of the South West region's agricultural production.

Other industries that are vital to the economic well-being of Greater Bunbury include retail and service industries, building industry, timber production and tourism. Bunbury is home to SIMCOA, which is Australia's only silicon manufacturing company. The Bunbury Port will continue to be the centre of economic activity for the Greater Bunbury sub-region with the flow of goods through it to and from all parts of the world. The proposed expansion of the port, as identified in the Bunbury Port Inner Harbour Structure Plan, will promote further economic growth for the sub-region, and may in time be an economic stimulus for the corporate support and ancillary services associated with port-based industries locating to Bunbury city centre, further strengthening its role as a regional city.

Education

Education is compulsory in Western Australia between the ages of six and seventeen, corresponding to primary and secondary school. Schools that serve high school students in the area include Bunbury Senior High School, Newton Moore Senior High School, Manea Senior College, College Row School (K–12 education support), Australind Senior High School, Eaton Community College, Dalyellup College, Bunbury Cathedral Grammar School (K–12), Bunbury Catholic College, Grace Christian School, and Our Lady of Mercy College.

Tertiary education
Tertiary education is available through a number of universities and technical and further education (TAFE) colleges. South Regional TAFE is a State Training Provider providing a range of vocational education with campuses in Bunbury, Albany, and other locations in the southern Western Australia region.

Edith Cowan University also has a campus based in Bunbury.

Media

Radio
AM band
 6EL 621 kHz AM – Easy listening format. Different from its Easy Listening Network partners in the Eastern states. Has local advertising. Part of Spirit Radio Network.
 ABC South West WA (6BS): 684 kHz AM – News, talk and sport. Broadcasts breakfast and morning programs from Bunbury.
 Triple M 963 kHz AM – Adult Contemporary for the 40+, with local news and sport. Mostly 60s, 70s, 80s, & 90s (part of the Southern Cross Austereo LocalWorks network)
 Vision Radio Network 1017 AM – Christian praise and worship music and talk
 6MM 1116 kHz AM – Easy listening format from Mandurah
 ABC Radio National 1224 kHz AM – Speciality talk and music
 ABC News Radio 1152 kHz AM – News and sport

FM band
 6MM (The Wave) 91.7 kHz FM – Easy listening format from Mandurah
 ABC Classic FM 93.3 MHz FM – Classical music
 Triple J 94.1 MHz FM – Alternative music
 Hit FM 95.7 MHz FM – Hit music (was Hot FM)
 Bunbury Community Radio 103.7 MHz FM
 Harvey Community Radio 96.5 MHz FM
 Coast FM 97.3 MHz FM – Hit music from Mandurah

Television
Television services available include:
The Australian Broadcasting Corporation (ABC) – ABC TV, ABC TV Plus/Kids, ABC Me, ABC News (digital channels)
The Special Broadcasting Service (SBS) – SBS TV, SBS Viceland, SBS World Movies, SBS Food, NITV (digital channels)
 GWN7 (Golden West Network), an owned formerly affiliated station of the Seven Network
 WIN Television, an affiliate station of the Nine Network
 West Digital Television, an affiliate station of the Network 10 (provided jointly by Prime Television and WIN Television)

The programming schedule is mainly the same as the Seven, Nine and Ten stations in Perth with variations for news bulletins, sport telecasts such as the Australian Football League and National Rugby League, children's and lifestyle programs and infomercials or paid programming.

GWN7 had its origins in Bunbury as BTW-3 in the late 1960s and then purchased other stations in Kalgoorlie and Geraldton, as well as launching a satellite service in 1986 to form the current network. GWN7's studios and offices are based at Roberts Crescent in Bunbury, with its transmitter located at Mount Lennard approximately 25 km to the east. The station produces a nightly 30-minute news program for regional WA at 5:30pm on weeknights.

WIN Television maintains a newsroom in the city; however, the station itself is based in Perth. The WIN newsroom provides regional coverage for sister station NEW-10's 10 News First bulletins at 5pm each night, which are simulcast on WIN.

On 28 July 2011, new digital television services from GWN and WIN commenced transmission. A new stand alone Network 10 affiliated channel branded as West Digital Television was the first of the new digital only channels to go on-air. The other new digital only channels that are also now available in Bunbury include 7two, 7mate, ishop tv, RACING.COM, 10 HD, 10 Bold, 10 Peach, A placeholder on channel 54 currently showing WIN Television’s Australian landmark videos, TVSN, Gold, 9Gem, 9Life and 9Go!.

Subscription Television service Foxtel is available via satellite.

Newspapers
Bunbury Herald, South Western Times and Bunbury Mail are local newspapers available in Bunbury and surrounding region.

Newspapers from Perth including The West Australian and The Sunday Times are also available, as well as national newspapers such as The Australian and The Australian Financial Review.

Culture

Arts and entertainment
A number of cultural organisations are located in Bunbury, including:
Bunbury Regional Art Galleries
Bunbury Regional Entertainment Centre, with theatre, film and live performance
Stirling Street Arts Centre

The Bunbury Historical Society is located in the historic King Cottage, which was built around 1880. In 1966 the cottage was purchased by the City of Bunbury and subsequently leased to the Society. The rooms of the cottage are furnished and artifacts displayed to reflect the way of life for a family in Bunbury in the period from the 1880s to the 1920s.

The WA Performing Arts Eisteddfod is held annually at the Bunbury Regional Entertainment Centre.

Tourism and recreation
There are many tourism and recreational opportunities in Bunbury. Some of the most popular attractions include
 Dolphin Discovery Centre
 Bunbury Back Beach
 Koombana Bay
 Bunbury Wildlife Park
 Bunbury Farmers Market
 Leschenault Inlet

Bunbury is also very close to the Ferguson Valley.

Sport

A number of football clubs are based in Bunbury and play in the South West Football League. A notable stadium is Hands Oval in South Bunbury.

Hay Park Sports Precinct is home to many junior and senior sports codes. Located in the precinct is South West Sports Centre, home to Bunbury Basketball Association.

Infrastructure

Health

Transport

TransWA provides rail and coach services from Bunbury Terminal: Australind train, GS3, SW1 and SW2 to Bunbury and services south from Bunbury and South West Coach Lines provides coach services to and from Bunbury. Bus services in Greater Bunbury are run by TransBunbury with 10 routes.

National Route 1 provides road access to the wider region, and includes:
Forrest Highway, a dual carriageway road linking north to Perth
South Western Highway linking to the southeast of Bunbury

Bussell Highway links to Busselton to the west.

The Eelup Rotary, where Forrest Highway terminates in East Bunbury, was named by the Royal Automobile Club of Western Australia as the worst regional intersection in Western Australia and has since undergone a $16m upgrade, which included eight sets of traffic lights (which were switched on in the early hours of Monday 21 May 2012) and extra lanes for each entrance. The government was criticised for breaking a 2008 election promise to build an overpass and underpass.

Bunbury is planned to be bypassed when the Bunbury Outer Ring Road is opened in 2024, linked Forrest Highway in Australind to Bussell Highway in Dalyellup.

Notable people
Notable people who come from or have lived in Bunbury include:

 Leon Baker, AFL footballer for Essendon Football Club, played in 1984 and 1985 Premierships
 Paul Barnard, AFL footballer for Essendon Football Club, played in 2000 Premiership
 Natalie Barr, current Sunrise news presenter
 Jamie Bennell, West Coast Eagles AFL player
 Noel Brunning, GWN news anchor
 Dianne Buswell, professional dancer, Strictly Come Dancing
 Dorothy Carroll, geologist
 Brett Peter Cowan, convicted murderer and rapist 
 Tracey Cross, Paralympic swimmer
Kevin Cullen, doctor and winemaker
 Mary Ellen Cuper, Aboriginal postmistress and telegraphist
 Courtney Eaton, actress, Mad Max: Fury Road
 Troy Elder, field hockey player
 Alexander Forrest, explorer, politician and investor
 John Forrest, First Premier of Western Australia and cabinet minister in Australia's first parliament
 Cameron Gliddon, Cairns Taipans NBL player
 Murray Goodwin, Zimbabwe, Western Australia and Sussex cricketer
 Alexandra Hagan, Olympic rower in Australian Women's Eight at the 2012 London and 2016 Rio de Janeiro Olympic games
 Ben Howlett, Essendon Football Club AFL player
 Adam Hunter, West Coast Eagles ex-AFL player
 Neville Jetta, Melbourne Football Club AFL player
 Bob Maumill, 882 6PR radio presenter
Newton Moore, Mayor of Bunbury, Minister for Lands and Agriculture, 8th Premier of Western Australia, Major General (WWI), member of the House of Commons of the United Kingdom  
John Boyle O'Reilly, Irish-born poet, sent to Bunbury in February, 1868 as a convict, escaped on an American whaling ship in 1869.
 Aristos Papandroulakis, television, Surprise Chef
 Kyle Reimers, Essendon Football Club ex-AFL player
Josh Risdon, Soccer player for Western Sydney Wanderers FC in the A-League and Australia national soccer team
 Edwin Rose, pastoralist president, Royal Agricultural Society of WA
 Barry Shepherd, cricketer
 Richard Adolphus Sholl, Member of the WA Legislative Council 1886–90, member of Legislative Assembly 1890–97

 Robert Frederick Sholl, Western Australian representative at the Australasian Federal Convention 1897
 Nicole Trunfio, model
 Bruce Wallrodt, Paralympic athlete
 Shani Waugh, professional golfer
 Mark Worthington, Cairns Taipans NBL player, 2008 and 2012 Olympian
 Jennifer Fowler, composer

See also
 List of Bunbury suburbs

References

External links

 City of Bunbury website
 Bunbury Historical Society's King Cottage Museum
 Local History of Bunbury
 Bunbury Port Authority

 
Coastal cities in Australia
Port cities in Western Australia
1836 establishments in Australia
Populated places established in 1836
Whaling stations in Australia